Kedar Nath Pandey (born January 1, 1943) is an Indian politician and leader of Communist Party of India from Bihar. He is a Member of Bihar Legislative Council Elected from Teachers Constituency.

Social and Political Activities
On the post of Secretary of Hindi Sahitya Sammelan, Siwan
On the post of Secretary of Bhojpuri Sahitya Sammelan, Siwan
From 1973 to 77 and from 1981 to 85 on the post of General Secretary of Bihar Secondary Teacher Association, Jamal Road, Patna.
From 1992 onwards as General Secretary of Bihar Secondary Teachers Association, Jamal Road, Patna.
Member of Indo-Soviet Friendship Alliance, Indo-German Friendship Alliance
Patron Member of the Society for Science
Officers in All India Secondary Teachers Federation and many other socio-cultural institutions
Working President, All India Bhojpuri Sahitya Sammelan, Patna.
Former State Vice President of Indian People's Theatre Association (IPTA)
Officer in Bihar Progressive Writers Association
Presently a new member of the Bihar Legislative Council from 7 May 2002 and the chairman of the request committee of the council.

Distinguished Achievement

(a) Published Works:

Hindi drama - Prithvi Raj Chauhan, Kaikeyi, Guru Dakshina, Veer Shivaji.

Bhojpuri drama - 'Shuruat' - honored with Jagannath Singh Samman by All India Bhojpuri Sahitya Sammelan. Presently included in the syllabus of Post Graduate Bhojpuri classes of Nalanda Open University, Patna.

Other Books-

Songs of 'Dil Dhul Jaane', 'Social concerns of education', 'Education will have to be made a movement', 'Pannas of memories', songs of the bygone era will also be sung, the Bhasma Aarti of Mahakal and the road going from village to city.

Geography textbooks for classes VII, VIII, IX, X, XI and XII of Bihar's secondary classes.

(b) editing-

Editing of Bhojpuri magazine 'Mati Ke Gamak' from 1975 to 1980, editing of 'Oriental Prabha' magazine of Bihar Secondary Teacher Association - from 1985–92, guest editor of several issues of 'Gyan-Vigyan' educational magazine, various papers- Publication of many articles, stories related to education, culture in magazines.

Organizing seminars / functions to create awareness in the field of education, culture and social .

Organizing programs to inculcate scientific attitude among students and teachers and organizing them on socio-educational questions to form an intellectual movement.

Establishment of educational institutions / construction of buildings etc.

(c) Established institutions—

Gaya Das Kabir U.V. Rashid Chakmathia, Siwan Bihar.

Shri Mukti Nath Balika Inter College, Kotwa Narayanpur, Ballia, Uttar Pradesh.

Amar Shaheed Shri Haridwar Rai Library, Kotwa Narayanpur, Ballia, Uttar Pradesh.

Other-

Experience of participating in seminars, workshops, discussions organized by National Council of Educational Research and Training, New Delhi, NIPA, All India Secondary Teachers Federation, Bihar Secondary Teachers Association, IPTA and other socio-cultural organizations.

Experience of attending several socio-educational conferences.

Experience of participating in National Workshop on National Education Policy 86 Bhubaneswar, Patna etc.

Representation of India on behalf of All India Secondary Teachers Association in Jakarta (Indonesia) Conference of South Asia Pacific Countries by Educational International.

Participation as a member of the Indian Delegation to 'Vietnam' on behalf of the India Peace Friendship Association.

teaching-

Teacher at Shri Krishna High School, Kailash, Siwan, Bihar from 9.7.1965 to 15.3.1981.

Principal of Gaya Das Kabir High School, Rashidchakmathia, Siwan, Bihar from 16.3.1981 to December 1995.

Headmaster at Modern High School Dariyapur, 95-96 in Patna.

Part time Professor of Education in Vidya Bhawan College, Siwan from 1973-75.

References

Communist Party of India politicians from Bihar
Living people
1943 births